Kiss the Bride Goodbye is a 1945 British romantic comedy drama film directed by Paul L. Stein and starring Patricia Medina and Jimmy Hanley. Jean Simmons has an early role, almost two years before she achieved stardom in Great Expectations.

The film was shot at the Riverside Studios in Hammersmith. The sets were designed by the art director James Carter.

Plot
Factory girl Joan Dodd (Medina) and Jack Fowler (Hanley) are in love and expect to marry in due course. When Jack is called up for war service, Joan's socially-ambitious mother (Ellen Pollock) seizes the chance to encourage the attentions of Joan's older boss Adolphus Pickering (Claud Allister), who is infatuated with her. Pickering proposes marriage and, under pressure from her mother, Joan accepts.

The preparations for the marriage are under way when Jack returns unexpectedly on leave from the army. On visiting Joan's, her mother hides him in another room whilst Joan's suitor arrives to request her father's permission to marry Joan. On the morning of the wedding, Joan finds out that Jack is back and tried to see her, so decides to go and explain to Jack. When she speaks to Jack's mother, she finds he's already left for the station to go to Scotland, so rushes to catch him. While Joan is still on the train talking to Jack, the train sets off. The pair decide to visit Joan's aunt and uncle in another area, and they assume that she and Jack are just married, and prepare a bridal chamber for the couple, much to their embarrassment. Comic misunderstandings ensue all round, until Joan finally insists on the right to marry the man of her choice.

Cast

 Patricia Medina as Joan Dodd
 Jimmy Hanley as Jack Fowler
 Marie Lohr as Emma Blood
 Frederick Leister as Capt. Blood
 Jean Simmons as Molly Dodd
 Ellen Pollock as Gladys Dodd
 Wylie Watson as David Dodd

 Claud Allister as Adolphus Pickering
 Muriel George as Mrs. Fowler
 Irene Handl as Mrs. Victory
 Hay Petrie as Fraser
 Aubrey Mallalieu as Reverend Glory
 C. Denier Warren as Reporter

Reception and later history
Although the plot of Kiss the Bride Goodbye was variously described as "naïve" and "ridiculous", contemporary critics in the main regarded the film as an enjoyable frivolity with one labelling it "jovial entertainment for the masses". The Film Report said "there are many laughs and few dull moments", but also found some of the humour on the risqué side: "The situations at times come very near the edge and there are many suggestive lines".

Survival
The subsequent history of the film is unclear. There was a record of a TV showing in the U.S. in 1953.  The British Film Institute had been unable to locate a print for inclusion in the BFI National Archive and classed the film as "missing, believed lost". Due to its interest as a populist production of its time and as a lost Simmons appearance, as well as increasing appreciation from film historians of Stein's directorial output in Britain, the film is included on the BFI's "75 Most Wanted" list of missing British feature films.

The Huntley Film Archives posted a clip on their official YouTube channel, claiming to have a copy of the entire feature. In 2013 Renown Pictures Ltd released a DVD of the film.

References

External links 
 BFI 75 Most Wanted entry, with extensive notes
 
 

1940s romantic comedy-drama films
British romantic comedy-drama films
British black-and-white films
Films directed by Paul L. Stein
1940s rediscovered films
Films shot at Riverside Studios
Films with screenplays by Jack Whittingham
Rediscovered British films
Films scored by Percival Mackey
1940s English-language films
1940s British films